The Ayer Keroh Square is a town square in Ayer Keroh, Melaka, Malaysia.

History
The square underwent renovation starting in July 2011 with a cost of MYR1.5 million, in which MYR1 million was allocated for upgrade work on the abandoned area of the square and MYR0.5 million was allocated for landscaping work.

See also
 List of tourist attractions in Malacca
 List of tourist attractions in Malaysia

References

Ayer Keroh
Squares in Malacca